New Jersey's 12th congressional district is represented by Democrat Bonnie Watson Coleman, who has served in Congress since 2015. The district is known for its research centers and educational institutions such as Princeton University, Rider University, The College of New Jersey, Institute for Advanced Study, Johnson & Johnson and Bristol-Myers Squibb. The district is primarily suburban in character, covering portions of Mercer, Somerset, Union, and Middlesex counties, although the district contains the state capital of Trenton as well as the smaller city of Plainfield.

History
The 12th congressional district (together with the 11th district) was created starting with the 63rd United States Congress in 1913, based on redistricting following the United States Census, 1910. Historically, the 12th and its predecessors had been a swing district. However, redistricting following the 2000 United States Census gave the district a somewhat bluer hue than its predecessor. It absorbed most of Trenton, along with a number of other municipalities. Since then, the 12th has become a Democratic-leaning district, as measured by the Cook PVI.  

The redistricting made second-term Democrat Rush D. Holt Jr. considerably more secure; he had narrowly defeated freshman Republican Michael Pappas in 1998, and had only held on to his seat against Dick Zimmer who represented the district from 1991 to 1997, by 651 votes in 2000. In 2002, despite an expensive challenge from former New Jersey Secretary of State Buster Soaries, Holt was re-elected with 61% of the vote.

The district became even more Democratic after redistricting following the 2010 census, as it lost its share of Republican-leaning Hunterdon County and Monmouth County, while being pushed further into strongly Democratic Middlesex County and gaining the overwhelmingly Democratic Union County town of Plainfield, as well as the portion of Trenton that it had not absorbed in the previous redistricting. Holt retired in 2014 and was succeeded by State Assembly Majority Leader Bonnie Watson Coleman, making her the first African-American woman elected to Congress from New Jersey.

Counties and municipalities in the district
For the 118th and successive Congresses (based on redistricting following the 2020 Census), the district contains all or portions of four counties and 32 municipalities.

Mercer County (7)
Ewing Township, Hopewell Borough, Hopewell Township, Pennington, Princeton, Trenton and West Windsor Township

Middlesex County (14)
Cranbury Township, Dunellen, East Brunswick Township, Helmetta, Jamesburg, Middlesex, Milltown, Monroe Township, North Brunswick Township, Old Bridge Township (part, also 6th), Plainsboro Township, South Brunswick Township, South River Borough, and Spotswood Borough

Somerset County (10)
Bound Brook, Bridgewater (part, also in 7th), Hillsborough (part, also in 7th), Franklin Township, Manville, Millstone, Montgomery, North Plainfield, Rocky Hill, and South Bound Brook

Union County (1)
Plainfield

Recent statewide election results

List of members representing the district

Recent election results

2012

2014

2016

2018

2020

2022

References

 Congressional Biographical Directory of the United States 1774–present

12
Hunterdon County, New Jersey
Mercer County, New Jersey
Middlesex County, New Jersey
Monmouth County, New Jersey
Somerset County, New Jersey
Constituencies established in 1913
1913 establishments in New Jersey